Graphium tynderaeus, the electric green swordtail, is a butterfly in the family Papilionidae. It is found in Guinea, Sierra Leone, Liberia, Ivory Coast, Ghana, Nigeria, Cameroon, Equatorial Guinea, Gabon, the Republic of the Congo, Angola, the Central African Republic, the Democratic Republic of the Congo and western Tanzania. Its habitat consists of primary lowland forests.

Males may mud-puddle but are extremely wary if approached.

Taxonomy
It is a member of the tynderaeus -clade (Graphium  tynderaeus, Graphium philonoe, Graphium  latreillianus).

References

tynder
Butterflies of Africa
Butterflies described in 1793